Adnan Al-Rifaey is a Syrian Islamic researcher.

Early life 
He graduated from University of Damascus in 1989 with a Civil Engineering Diploma.

Career 
He served in the Department of Education in Syria, published his first book in 1994, and published many books and booklets including:

Great Miracle
Destiny
The Infinite Right
The Infinite Wise
for the sake of wise

He was best known for his TV debates with Orthodox Muslims. He appeared in many TV series, such as Great Miracle, named for his book. He is known for his citations of the Quran and for staying away from Narrations or Hadiths. He invites people to use their minds in understanding the Quran and invites debaters to re-authenticate the Hadiths depending only on the Quran.

One of his most popular works, is the numeral miracle in the Quran. He had many books about that with hundreds of examples and explanations, and also talked about this miracle in the TV series in the path of Wise.

He is known for inviting to unite the Islamic people under the Quranic Laws, not to be divided in Madhabs and divisions, claiming that the Quran is the only way to get the original Islam. He was accused by many other Islamic Sheiks and other people to be non-Quranic, but he denied that accusation in his programs, his famous words are:

He is known for his on-going defense of the Quran, and searching in it, and his rejection of many traditional Laws of Islam including:
 Nasikh wa mansukh
 Divorce Law
 Restriction of freedom of religion
 The belief that some people go out of Hell after being punished for a period of time.

References

Islamism
Islamic philosophers
Muslim reformers
21st-century Muslim scholars of Islam
1961 births
Living people